Sheikh Afil Uddin is a Bangladesh Awami League politician and the incumbent Member of Parliament from Jessore-1.

Early life 
Uddin was born on 6 May 1966. His father, Sheikh Akij Uddin, is the founder of Akij Group. He is also related to fellow member of parliament Monirul Islam Monir.

Career
Uddin was elected to parliament in 2008. He was reelected to government in the 5 January 2014 elections unopposed. In the elections, a voice recording of his emerged in which he appeared to instruct fellow Awami League candidates on how to rig the elections.

Uddin was re-elected in 2018 with 325,793 votes from Jessore-2 while his nearest rival, Abu Sayed Muhammad Shahadat Hussain of Bangladesh Nationalist Party, received 13,940 votes.

References

Awami League politicians
Living people
9th Jatiya Sangsad members
10th Jatiya Sangsad members
11th Jatiya Sangsad members
Year of birth missing (living people)